Branko "Stane" Stanković (31 October 1921 – 20 February 2002) was a Bosnian Serb footballer and manager, from Sarajevo.

Playing career

Club
He started his career in SK Slavija Sarajevo, as a youth player in 1936. In 1941 he escaped from Sarajevo and joined Yugoslav pre-war most successful club, BSK Belgrade and played in the Serbian League during the war. In 1946 he came to Red Star Belgrade, where he established himself as one of the best defenders in the Yugoslav First League. Stanković played 195 games, with 14 scored goals.

International
Stanković mainly played for Red Star Belgrade and was capped 61 times for Yugoslavia. He participated at two World Cups and won a silver medal at each of the 1948 Olympics and the 1952 Olympics. His final international was a November 1956 friendly match away against England.

Stanković is one of the most elegant defense players of his time. Because of his playing style, he earned his nickname Ambassador. Players such as Bruno Belin, Milovan Đorić, Fahrudin Jusufi, Petar Krivokuća used to copy his playing style. He was strong, fast and very brave player, also a good header.

He retired in 1958 before his 37th birthday.

Managerial career
Stanković started his managerial career in Sarajevo in 1960, as manager of Željezničar. Later, he managed Red Star Belgrade and reached the 1979 UEFA Cup Final with them. Beside Red Star, he also managed a number of teams in different countries, such as Fenerbahçe and Beşiktaş in Turkey, Porto in Portugal, AEK Athens, Aris Thessaloniki and PAOK in Greece. He also coached Željezničar Sarajevo, Olimpija Ljubljana and FK Vojvodina in the spells. During 1966, he was also co-manager of the Yugoslavia national team along with Aleksandar Tirnanić, Miljan Miljanić, Rajko Mitić and Vujadin Boškov.

He is also famous because of his incident with one of the most popular Yugoslav players during that time, Dragan Stojković. Stanković retired from managing in 1989.

Personal life
He had a degree in Physical education. He was married and had two sons, Dragan and Ratko.

Honours

Player
BSK Beograd
Serbian Football League: 1942–43, 1943–44
Red Star Belgrade
Yugoslav First League: 1951, 1952–53, 1955–56, 1955–57
Yugoslav Cup: 1948, 1949, 1950

Manager
Vojvodina
Yugoslav First League: 1965–66
AEK Athens
Alpha Ethniki: 1970–71
Red Star Belgrade
Yugoslav First League: 1979–80, 1980–81
Fenerbahçe
Süper Lig: 1982–83
Turkish Cup: 1982–83
Beşiktaş
Süper Lig: 1985–86

References

External links

1921 births
2002 deaths
Footballers from Sarajevo
Serbs of Bosnia and Herzegovina
Association football defenders
Yugoslav footballers
Yugoslavia international footballers
Olympic medalists in football
Footballers at the 1948 Summer Olympics
Medalists at the 1948 Summer Olympics
Footballers at the 1952 Summer Olympics
Medalists at the 1952 Summer Olympics
Olympic footballers of Yugoslavia
Olympic silver medalists for Yugoslavia
1950 FIFA World Cup players
1954 FIFA World Cup players
FK Slavija Sarajevo players
OFK Beograd players
Red Star Belgrade footballers
Yugoslav First League players
Yugoslav football managers
FK Željezničar Sarajevo managers
NK Olimpija Ljubljana (1945–2005) managers
FK Vojvodina managers
Yugoslavia national football team managers
AEK Athens F.C. managers
Aris Thessaloniki F.C. managers
FC Porto managers
PAOK FC managers
Red Star Belgrade managers
Fenerbahçe football managers
Beşiktaş J.K. managers
Karşıyaka S.K. managers
Yugoslav First League managers
Super League Greece managers
Primeira Liga managers
Süper Lig managers
Yugoslav expatriate football managers
Expatriate football managers in Greece
Yugoslav expatriate sportspeople in Greece
Expatriate football managers in Portugal
Yugoslav expatriate sportspeople in Portugal
Expatriate football managers in Turkey
Yugoslav expatriate sportspeople in Turkey